The Institute for Ethics and Emerging Technologies (IEET) is a technoprogressive think tank that seeks to "promote ideas about how technological progress can increase freedom, happiness, and human flourishing in democratic societies." It was incorporated in the United States in 2004, as a non-profit 501(c)(3) organization, by philosopher Nick Bostrom and bioethicist James Hughes.

The think tank aims to influence the development of public policies that distribute the benefits and reduce the risks of technological change. It has been described as "[a]mong the more important groups" in the transhumanist movement, and as being among the transhumanist groups that "play a strong role in the academic arena".
 
The IEET works with Humanity Plus (also founded and chaired by Bostrom and Hughes, and previously known as the World Transhumanist Association), an international non-governmental organization with a similar mission but with an activist rather than academic approach. A number of technoprogressive thinkers are offered positions as IEET Fellows. Individuals who have accepted such appointments with the IEET support the institute's mission, but they have expressed a wide range of views about emerging technologies and not all identify themselves as transhumanists. In early October 2012, Kris Notaro became the managing director of the IEET after the previous Managing Director Hank Pellissier stepped down. In April 2016, Steven Umbrello became the managing director of the IEET. Marcelo Rinesi is the IEET's Chief Technology Officer.

Activities

Publications
The Institute publishes, the Journal of Ethics and Emerging Technologies (JEET), formerly the Journal of Evolution and Technology (JET), a peer-reviewed academic journal. JET was established in 1998 as the Journal of Transhumanism and obtained its current title in 2004. The editor-in-chief is Mark Walker. It covers futurological research into long-term developments in science, technology, and philosophy that "many mainstream journals shun as too speculative, radical, or interdisciplinary."  The institute also maintains a technology and ethics blog that is supported by various writers.

Programs
In 2006, the IEET launched the following activities:
Securing the Future: Identification and advocacy for global solutions to threats to the future of civilization.
Rights of the Person: Campaign to deepen and broaden the concept of human rights.
Longer, Better Lives: Case for longer healthier lives, addressing objections to life extension, challenge ageist and ableist attitudes that discourage the full utilization of health technology.
Envisioning the Future: Collection of images of posthumanity and non-human intelligence, positive, negative and neutral, e.g., in science fiction and popular culture; engagement with cultural critics, artists, writers, and filmmakers in exploring the lessons to be derived from these.
The institute has since shifted its research away from these programs and towards research on the policy implications of human enhancement and other emerging technologies. It has since partnered with the Applied Ethics Center at the University of Massachusetts Boston to focus on two specific programs:

 Artificial Intelligence and the Future of Work, Democracy, and Conflict
 Cyborgs and Human Enhancement

Conferences
In late May 2006, the IEET held the Human Enhancement Technologies and Human Rights conference at the Stanford University Law School in Stanford, California.
The IEET along with other progressive organizations hosted a conference in December 2013 at Yale University on giving various species "personhood" rights. Fellows of the Institute represent the Institute at various conferences and events, including the NASA Institute for Advanced Concepts and the American Association for the Advancement of Science. In 2014, the IEET lead and/or co-sponsored five conferences including: Eros Evolving: The Future of Love, Sex, Marriage and Beauty conference in April in Piedmont, California, and the Global Existential Risks and Radical Futures conference in June in Piedmont, California.

Reception

Wesley J. Smith, an American conservative lawyer and advocate of intelligent design, wrote that the institute has one of the most active transhumanist websites, and the writers write on the "nonsense of uploading minds into computers and fashioning a post humanity." Smith also criticized the results of the institute's online poll that indicated the majority of Institute's readers are atheist or agnostic. According to Smith, this was evidence that transhumanism is a religion and a desperate attempt to find purpose in a nihilistic and materialistic world. The institute's advocacy project to raise the status of animals to the legal status of personhood also drew criticism from Smith because he claimed humans are exceptional and raising the status of animals may lower the status of humans.

Katarina Felsted and Scott D. Wright wrote that although the IEET considers itself technoprogressive some of its views can be described as strong transhumanism or a "radical version of post ageing," and one particular criticism of both moderate and strong transhumanism is that moral arbitrariness undermine both forms of transhumanism.

References

External links
 Institute for Ethics and Emerging Technologies
 Journal for Evolution and Technology

Ethics of science and technology
Charities based in Connecticut
Think tanks based in the United States
Ethics organizations
Transhumanist organizations
Existential risk organizations